Benjamin Church House may refer to:

Benjamin Church House (Bristol, Rhode Island), listed on the National Register of Historic Places in Bristol County, Rhode Island
Benjamin Church House (Shorewood, Wisconsin), listed on the National Register of Historic Places in Milwaukee County, Wisconsin